NorthernSound is the second compilation album by 6ixBuzz. It was self-released on December 13, 2019. A deluxe edition of the album with four more tracks was later released on February 25, 2020.

Background
NorthernSound is the second compilation album by Toronto-based entertainment and media company  Canadian entertainment company and media platform 6ixBuzz, under their division 6ixBuzz Entertainment. The album contains 13-tracks and features Toronto based artists including NorthSideBenji, Houdini, Casper TNG, K Money, Pvrx, LocoCity, Da Crook, Puffy L’z, Ramriddlz, Roney, and more. It was released on December 13, 2019, via digital download including Apple Music and Spotify. The album was executively produced by Canadian record producer Jmak.

The lead single, "Too Soft" by Houdini and NorthSideBenji, was premiered on BBC 1xtra by Kenny Allstar. The album was the last appearance by Bvlly and Why-S before their deaths on Christmas Eve.

Track listing

Notes
 "On Go" featuring Layla Hendryx & Why-G was originally added in the deluxe edition but later removed
 "World is Yours" featuring Jimmy Prime, SAFE and Jay Whiss also credits them as Full Circle

References

6ixBuzz albums
2019 compilation albums
Hip hop compilation albums
Underground hip hop compilation albums